The New Democratic Spirit is a centre-right conservative political party in Albania. New Democratic Spirit was created by Gazmend Oketa, the former Deputy Prime Minister and Defense Minister of the Republic of Albania, and other former members of the Democratic Party of Albania. Albanian media call it "the President's Party", referring to Albanian President Bamir Topi.

Chairmen of NDS

References

External links

2012 establishments in Albania
Conservative parties in Albania
Liberal conservative parties
Political parties established in 2012
Political parties in Albania
Pro-European political parties in Albania